Galium album, the white bedstraw or hedge bedstraw, is a herbaceous annual plant of the family Rubiaceae.

Description
The stems can grow to at least 150 cm and are more or less erect with ascending branches. The stem is square in section with slight flanges. The plant is relatively hairless with shiny leaves and stem. Flowers are white or yellowish. The fruit are hairless.

Habitat and distribution
Galium album is widespread over much of Europe, being native to a large region from Britain to Morocco, east to Turkey and Western Siberia. It is naturalized in Ireland, Scandinavia, Greenland and South Australia. It is found in pastures, grassy banks, etc., especially on dry calcareous soils. In Britain, G. album is local in lowland England, rare in the north and very rare in Scotland.

Subspecies
Four subspecies are currently (May 2014) recognized:

Galium album subsp. album  - most of the range of the species
Galium album subsp. prusense (K.Koch) Ehrend. & Krendl - Greece, Bulgaria, Crimea, Turkey, Caucasus
Galium album subsp. pycnotrichum (Heinr. Braun) Kren - from Poland south to Greece and Turkey
Galium album subsp. suberectum (Klokov) Michalk - Carpathian Mountains of western Ukraine

References

External links

USDA Plants Profile: Galium album

Biolib
INDEX SYNONYMIQUE DE LA FLORE DE FRANCE
Tropicos
Altervista Flora Italiana

album
Flora of Europe
Flora of Turkey
Flora of Siberia
Flora of South Australia
Flora of Greenland
Flora of Russia
Flora of Ukraine
Plants described in 1768
Taxa named by Philip Miller